Brazil – Suriname relations refer to the bilateral relations between the Federative Republic of Brazil and the Republic of Suriname. Diplomatic relations were established on 3 March 1976. Brazil has an embassy in Paramaribo since the independence of Suriname on 25 November 1975. Suriname has an embassy in Brasília since 1976, and a consulate in Belém since 2012.

Border
Suriname and Brazil share a border in the Tumuk Humak Mountains. In 1906, the border was defined by the Treaty of Limits. There is no road connection between Brazil and Suriname. Plans to extend BR-163 into Suriname exist, however as of 2021, there is still a  gap between Pokigron, Suriname and Oriximiná, Brazil. There is an unpaved path between Missão Tiriyó and Sipaliwini Savanna which is used by the Tiriyó people who inhabit the border region.

History
In general, there have been friendly relations between Brazil and Suriname. There were official state visits from Suriname to Brazil in 1996, and 2018. The relationship became strained in 2000, when a  into the illegal drug trade wanted to question Surinamese ambassador . Christopher refused to see them, and was subsequentially expelled from Brazil. The relationship was normalised in 2002, when  was installed as ambassador to Brazil.

In 2009, riots erupted in the Surinamese town of Albina after a Maroon inhabitant of the area was allegedly stabbed by a Brazilian immigrant. Between 1 and 7 people were killed as a result, with over many more missing. The Brazilian immigrants in the area surrounding Albina were quickly evacuated to Paramaribo, the Surinamese capital.

In January 2022, Brazilian President Jair Bolsonaro paid an official visit to Suriname. It was the first visit to Suriname by a Brazilian head of state since 2005, when then-President Luiz Inácio Lula da Silva was in Paramaribo.

Trade
Trade between Suriname and Brazil is limited. In 2019, Suriname exported US$ 36.1 million worth of goods to Brazil with the main export product being shag tobacco. Brazil exported US$ 41 million worth of good with the main products being construction vehicles, and poultry.

Migration
Suriname has a significant amount of Brazilians living in their country. The 2000 estimation was 40,000 people. A large portion of the Brazilians are garimpeiros (illegal gold prospectors) who have created villages like Villa Brazil, and Antonio do Brinco. The Brazilian word garimpeiro has become the generic term for artisan gold prospectors both in Suriname and French Guiana.

See also
 Foreign relations of Brazil
 Foreign relations of Suriname

References

 
Suriname
Bilateral relations of Suriname